Parliamentary elections were held in Tajikistan on 1 March 2020. The result was a landslide victory for the ruling People's Democratic Party, which won 47 of the 63 seats. The only opposition party, the Social Democratic Party, received just 0.3% of the vote.

The Organization for Security and Co-operation in Europe was critical of the election.

Electoral system
The 63 members of the Assembly of Representatives are elected by two methods: 41 members are elected in single-member constituencies using the two-round system, whilst 22 seats are elected by proportional representation in a single nationwide constituency, with an electoral threshold of 5%. Voters cast a single ballot for a candidate in their single-member constituency, with the total votes received across all constituencies used to determine the proportional seats. In each constituency, voter turnout is required to be at least 50%  for the election to be declared valid.

Campaign
A total of 241 candidates contested the elections, 65 for the 22 party-list seats and 176 for the 41 constituency seats.

The Islamic Renaissance Party of Tajikistan was unable to participate, having been banned by the authorities over terrorism allegations in 2015.

Preliminary results

References

Tajikistan
Elections in Tajikistan
Parliamentary
Election and referendum articles with incomplete results